Megan Eileen Courtney-Lush (born October 27, 1993) is an American indoor professional volleyball player for the United States women's national volleyball team. Courtney played outside hitter for the Penn State women's volleyball team, and won back to back national championships in 2013 and 2014.  With the USA national team, she played at the 2017 FIVB World Grand Prix. She was named the best libero at the 2019 FIVB Volleyball Women's Nations League. Courtney was also selected as an alternate to the 2020 USA Olympic Team but did not travel to Tokyo.

Career

High School and College
Courtney's volleyball career began in 2008, playing for four years with Archbishop Alter High School in Kettering, Ohio. She played college women's volleyball at Penn State, where in her freshman season she was the Big Ten Freshman of the Year as well as the AVCA Mideast Region Freshman of the Year. In her next two seasons, she helped Penn State to back-to-back NCAA Titles. In the 2014 NCAA Tournament, she earned Most Outstanding Player honors after she recorded career-high 23 kills and 16 digs in the national semifinals win over Stanford. She had 11 kills and 14 digs in the NCAA Championship win over BYU.

International
In 2016, she signed her first professional contract at Leonas de Ponce in the Liga de Voleibol Superior Femenino. In the summer of 2016, she made her debut in the US women's national team. In 2017, she won the 2017 Women's Pan-American Volleyball Cup gold medal. In the 2016-17 season she arrived in Poland, where he plays the ORLEN Liga with the Impla of Breslavia. In the following season she played for Çanakkale, a Turkish Sultanlar league club.

In May 2021, she was named to team USA's 18-player roster for the FIVB Volleyball Nations League tournament. that was played May 25-June 24 in Rimini, Italy. Team USA would eventually win the gold medal after defeating Brazil in the finals. She was a selected as an Olympic alternate for the 2020 Summer Olympics.

After three seasons in teams of the Italian League, she was picked by Imoco Volley Conegliano as outside hitter. In her debut match with her new club she won her first professional title, the 2021 Italian Super Cup, and received the Most Valuable Player award.

Clubs 
 Leonas de Ponce (2015-2016)
 Impel Wrocław (2016-2017)
 Çanakkale Belediyespor (2017-2018)
 Volley Bergamo (2018-2019)
 Igor Gorgonzola Novara (2019-2020)
 Pallavolo Scandicci (2020-2021)
 Imoco Volley (2021-2022)

Awards

Clubs
 2021 Italian Supercup -  Champions, with Imoco Volley Conegliano
 2021-22 Italian Cup (Coppa Italia) -  Champion, with Imoco Volley Conegliano

Individuals
 2019 FIVB Nations League – "Best Libero"
 2021 Italian A1 League Super Cup – Most Valuable Player

See also 
 List of Pennsylvania State University Olympians

References

External links 
 profile Team USA

living people
1993 births
American women's volleyball players
Outside hitters
Liberos
Penn State Nittany Lions women's volleyball players
Expatriate volleyball players in Poland
Expatriate volleyball players in Turkey
American expatriate sportspeople in Poland
American expatriate sportspeople in Turkey
Serie A1 (women's volleyball) players
Expatriate volleyball players in Italy